Matías Daniel Cupayolo (born 19 December 1997) is an Argentine professional footballer who plays as a right-back for CAI.

Career
Cupayolo began his career with Guillermo Brown. His first taste of senior football came in the Copa Argentina, with Cupayolo being an unused substitute for ties with Deportivo Madryn, CAI and Chacarita Juniors between 2014 and 2017. He made his professional bow in Primera B Nacional on 18 March 2018 during a scoreless draw versus Los Andes. He started a further five matches throughout the 2017–18 campaign. He was released in June 2019, prior to signing for Torneo Patagónico team JJ Moreno. In January 2020, Cupayolo joined CAI in Torneo Regional Federal Amateur.

Career statistics
.

References

External links

1997 births
Living people
Sportspeople from Mendoza Province
Argentine footballers
Association football defenders
Primera Nacional players
Guillermo Brown footballers
Comisión de Actividades Infantiles footballers